Sidney Smith (26 March 1908 – 26 June 1990) was a professional billiards and snooker player from the 1930s to the 1950s. He was born in Killamarsh, Derbyshire, England.

He was the first player to make a total clearance in snooker competition, a break of 133 on 11 December 1936 in the Daily Mail Gold Cup.

Smith's most notable tournament wins were the 1948 United Kingdom Professional Billiards Championship (beating John Barrie 7000–6428) and the 1951/1952 News of the World Snooker Tournament.

Smith was the runner-up to Joe Davis in the World Snooker Championships of 1938 (having beaten Joe's brother Fred 18–13 in the semi-final) and 1939, and he was a semi-finalist on four occasions (1937, 1940, 1947, 1949).

Smith was the runner-up to Alec Brown in the 1938/1939 Daily Mail Gold Cup and later runner-up to Joe Davis in the 1949/50 News of the World Tournament and the 1950 Sporting Record Masters' Snooker Tournament.

Smith made three 1000+ billiard breaks in his career, with his highest being a break of 1292.

Smith died in 1990 aged 82.

Performance and rankings timeline

References

External links 
 Billiards with Sidney Smith – video from the British Pathe Archive
  – video

1908 births
1990 deaths
English snooker players
English players of English billiards
People from Killamarsh
Sportspeople from Derbyshire